Chad of Mercia (died 2 March 672) was a prominent 7th-century Anglo-Saxon Catholic monk who became abbot of several monasteries, Bishop of the Northumbrians and subsequently Bishop of the Mercians and Lindsey People. He was later canonised as a saint. 

He was the brother of Cedd, also a saint. He features strongly in the work of the Venerable Bede and is credited, together with Cedd, with introducing Christianity to the Mercian kingdom.

Sources

Most of our knowledge of Chad comes from the writings of the Venerable Bede. Bede tells us that he obtained his information about Chad and his brother, Cedd, from the monks of Lastingham, where both were abbots. Bede also refers to information he received from Trumbert, "who tutored me in the Scriptures and who had been educated in the monastery by that master", i.e. Chad. In other words, Bede considered himself to stand in the spiritual lineage of Chad and had gathered information from at least one who knew him personally.

Early life and education

Family links
Chad was one of four brothers, all active in the Anglo-Saxon church. The others were Cedd, Cynibil and Caelin. Chad seems to have been Cedd's junior, arriving on the political scene about ten years after Cedd. It is reasonable to suppose that Chad and his brothers were drawn from the Northumbrian nobility. They certainly had close connections throughout the Northumbrian ruling class. However, the name Chad is actually of British Celtic, rather than Anglo-Saxon origin. It is an element found in the personal names of many Welsh princes and nobles of the period and signifies "battle".

Education
The only major fact that Bede gives about Chad's early life is that he was a student of Aidan at the Celtic monastery at Lindisfarne. In fact, Bede attributes the general pattern of Chad's ministry to the example of Aidan and his own brother, Cedd, who was also a student of St. Aidan.

Aidan was a disciple of Columba and was invited by King Oswald of Northumbria to come from Iona to establish a monastery. Aidan arrived in Northumbria in 635 and died in 651. Chad must have studied at Lindisfarne some time between these years.

Travels in Ireland and dating of Chad's life
A number of ecclesiastical settlements were established in 7th century Ireland to accommodate European monks, particularly Anglo-Saxon monks. Around 668, Bishop Colman resigned his see at Lindisfarne and returned to Ireland. Less than three years later he erected an abbey in County Mayo exclusively for the English monks in Mayo, subsequently known as Maigh Eo na Saxain ("Mayo of the Saxons").

Chad traveled to Ireland as a monk, before he was ordained a priest. One of his companions was Ecgberht of Ripon. Egbert was of the Anglian nobility, probably from Northumbria. Bede places them among an influx of English scholars who arrived in Ireland while Finan and Colmán were bishops at Lindisfarne. This suggests that they left for Ireland some time after Aidan's death in 651. They went to Rath Melsigi, an Anglo-Saxon monastery in County Carlow, for further study. In the controversy over the keeping of Easter, Rath Melsigi accepted the Roman computation. 

In 664 the twenty-five year old Egbert barely survived a plague that had killed all his other companions. Chad had by then already left Ireland to help his brother Cedd establish the monastery of Laestingaeu in Yorkshire.    

The Benedictine rule was slowly spreading across Western Europe. Chad was trained in an entirely distinct monastic tradition that tended to look back to Martin of Tours as an exemplar. The Irish and early Anglo-Saxon monasticism experienced by Chad was peripatetic, stressed ascetic practices and had a strong focus on Biblical exegesis, which generated a profound eschatological consciousness. Egbert recalled later that he and Chad "followed the monastic life together very strictly – in prayers and continence, and in meditation on Holy Scripture". Some of the scholars quickly settled in Irish monasteries, while others wandered from one master to another in search of knowledge. Bede says that the Irish monks gladly taught them and fed them, and even let them use their valuable books, without charge. Since books were all produced by hand, with painstaking attention to detail, this was astonishingly generous.

Founding of Lastingham

King Oswiu of Northumbria appointed his nephew, Œthelwald, to administer the coastal area of Deira. Chad's brother Cælin was chaplain at Œthelwald's court. It was on the initiative of Cælin that Ethelwald donated land for the building of a monastery at Lastingham near Pickering in the North York Moors, close to one of the still-usable Roman roads. Caelin introduced Ethelwold to Cedd. The monastery became a base for Cedd, who was serving as a missionary bishop in Essex.

Bede says that Cedd "fasted strictly in order to cleanse it from the filth of wickedness previously committed there". On the thirtieth day of his forty-day fast, he was called away on urgent business. Cynibil, another of his brothers, took over the fast for the remaining ten days. The incident indicates the brothers ties with Northumbria's ruling dynasty. Laestingaeu was clearly conceived as a base for the family and destined to be under their control for the foreseeable future – not an unusual arrangement in this period. Cedd was stricken by the plague, and upon his death in 664, Chad succeeded him as abbot.

Abbot of Lastingham
Chad's first appearance as an ecclesiastical prelate occurs in 664, shortly after the Synod of Whitby, when many Church leaders had been wiped out by the plague – among them Cedd, who died that year at Lastingham. On the death of his elder brother, Chad succeeded to the position of abbot.

Bede tells us of a man called Owin (Owen), who appeared at the door of Lastingham. Owin was a household official of Æthelthryth, an East Anglian princess who had come to marry Ecgfrith, Oswiu's younger son. He decided to renounce the world, and as a sign of this appeared at Lastingham in ragged clothes and carrying an axe. He had come primarily to work manually. He became one of Chad's closest associates.

Chad's eschatological consciousness and its effect on others is brought to life in a reminiscence attributed to Trumbert, who was one of his students at Lastingham. Chad used to break off reading whenever a gale sprang up and call on God to have pity on humanity. If the storm intensified, he would shut his book altogether and prostrate himself in prayer. During prolonged storms or thunderstorms he would go into the church itself to pray and sing psalms until calm returned. His monks obviously regarded this as an extreme reaction even to English weather and asked him to explain. Chad explained that storms are sent by God to remind humans of the day of judgement and to humble their pride. The typically Celtic Christian involvement with nature was not like the modern romantic preoccupation but a determination to read in it the mind of God, particularly in relation to the last things.

Rise of a dynasty
In fact, it is possible that he had only recently returned from Ireland when prominence was thrust upon him. However, the growing importance of his family within the Northumbrian state is clear from Bede's account of Cedd's career of the founding of their monastery at Lastingham in North Yorkshire. This concentration of ecclesiastical power and influence within the network of a noble family was probably common in Anglo-Saxon England: an obvious parallel would be the children of King Merewalh in Mercia in the following generation.

Cedd, probably the elder brother, had become a very prominent figure in the Church while Chad was in Ireland. Probably as a newly ordained priest, he was sent in 653 by Oswiu on a difficult mission to the Middle Angles, at the request of their sub-king Peada, part of a developing pattern of Northumbrian intervention in Mercian affairs. After perhaps a year, he was recalled and sent on a similar mission to the East Saxons, being ordained bishop shortly afterwards. Cedd's position as both a Christian missionary and a royal emissary compelled him to travel often between Essex and Northumbria.

Bishop of the Northumbrians

Need for a bishop
Bede gives great prominence to the Synod of Whitby in 663/4, which he shows resolving the main issues of practice in the Northumbrian Church in favour of Roman practice. Cedd is shown acting as the main go-between in the synod because of his facility with all of the relevant languages. Cedd was not the only prominent churchman to die of plague shortly after the synod. This was one of several outbreaks of the plague; they badly hit the ranks of the Church leadership, with most of the bishops in the Anglo-Saxon kingdoms dead, including the archbishop of Canterbury. Bede tells us that Colmán, the bishop of the Northumbrians at the time of the Synod, had left for Scotland after the Synod went against him. He was succeeded by Tuda, who lived only a short time after his accession. The tortuous process of replacing him is covered by Bede briefly, but in some respects puzzlingly.

Mission of Wilfrid

The first choice to replace Tuda was Wilfrid, a particularly zealous partisan of the Roman cause. Because of the plague, there were not the requisite three bishops available to ordain him, so he had gone to the Frankish Kingdom of Neustria to seek ordination. This was on the initiative of Alfrid, sub-king of Deira, although presumably Oswiu knew and approved this action at the time. Bede tells us that Alfrid sought a bishop for himself and his own people. This probably means the people of Deira. According to Bede, Tuda had been succeeded as abbot of Lindisfarne by Eata, who had been elevated to the rank of bishop.

Wilfrid met with his own teacher and patron, Agilbert, a spokesman for the Roman side at Whitby, who had been made bishop of Paris. Agilbert set in motion the process of ordaining Wilfrid canonically, summoning several bishops to Compiègne for the ceremony. Bede tells us that he then lingered abroad for some time after his ordination.

Elevation

Bede implies that Oswiu decided to take further action because Wilfrid was away for longer than expected. It is unclear whether Oswiu changed his mind about Wilfrid, or whether he despaired of his return, or whether he never really intended him to become bishop but used this opportunity to get him out of the country.

Chad was invited then to become bishop of the Northumbrians by King Oswiu. Chad is often listed as a Bishop of York. Bede generally uses ethnic, not geographical, designations for Chad and other early Anglo-Saxon bishops. However at this point, he does also refer to Oswiu's desire that Chad become bishop of the church in York. York later became the diocesan city partly because it had already been designated as such in the earlier Roman-sponsored mission of Paulinus to Deira, so it is not clear whether Bede is simply echoing the practice of his own day, or whether Oswiu and Chad were considering a territorial basis and a see for his episcopate. It is quite clear that Oswiu intended Chad to be bishop over the entire Northumbrian people, over-riding the claims of both Wilfrid and Eata.

Chad faced the same problem over ordination as Wilfrid, and so set off to seek ordination amid the chaos caused by the plague. Bede tells us that he travelled first to Canterbury, where he found that Archbishop Deusdedit was dead and his replacement was still awaited. Bede does not tell us why Chad diverted to Canterbury. The journey seems pointless, since the archbishop had died three years previously – a fact that must have been well known in Northumbria, and was the very reason Wilfrid had to go abroad. The most obvious reason for Chad's tortuous travels would be that he was also on a diplomatic mission from Oswiu, seeking to build an encircling alliance around Mercia, which was rapidly recovering from its position of weakness. From Canterbury he travelled to Wessex, where he was ordained by bishop Wini of the West Saxons and two British, i.e. Welsh, bishops. None of these bishops was recognised by Rome. Bede points out that "at that time there was no other bishop in all Britain canonically ordained except Wini" and the latter had been installed irregularly by the king of the West Saxons.

Bede describes Chad at this point as "a diligent performer in deed of what he had learnt in the Scriptures should be done." Bede also tells us that Chad was teaching the values of Aidan and Cedd. His life was one of constant travel. Bede says that Chad visited continually the towns, countryside, cottages, villages and houses to preach the Gospel. Clearly, the model he followed was one of the bishop as prophet or missionary. Basic Christian rites of passage, baptism and confirmation, were almost always performed by a bishop, and for decades to come they were generally carried out in mass ceremonies, probably with little systematic instruction or counselling.

Removal
In 666, Wilfrid returned from Neustria, "bringing many rules of Catholic observance", as Bede says. He found Chad already occupying the same position. It seems that he did not in fact challenge Chad's pre-eminence in his own area. Rather, he would have worked assiduously to build up his own support in sympathetic monasteries, like Gilling and Ripon. He did, however, assert his episcopal rank by going into Mercia and even Kent to ordain priests. Bede tells us that the net effect of his efforts on the Church was that the Irish monks who still lived in Northumbria either came fully into line with Catholic practices or left for home. Nevertheless, Bede cannot conceal that Oswiu and Chad had broken significantly with Roman practice in many ways and that the Church in Northumbria had been divided by the ordination of rival bishops.

In 669, a new Archbishop of Canterbury, Theodore of Tarsus, sent by Pope Vitalian arrived in England. He immediately set off on a tour of the country, tackling abuses of which he had been forewarned. He instructed Chad to step down and Wilfrid to take over. According to Bede, Theodore was so impressed by Chad's show of humility that he confirmed his ordination as bishop, while insisting he step down from his position. Chad retired gracefully and returned to his post as abbot of Lastingham, leaving Wilfrid as bishop of the Northumbrians at York.

Bishop of the Mercians

Recall
Later that same year, King Wulfhere of Mercia requested a bishop. Wulfhere and the other sons of Penda had converted to Christianity, although Penda himself had remained a pagan until his death (655). Penda had allowed bishops to operate in Mercia, although none had succeeded in establishing the Church securely without active royal support.

Archbishop Theodore refused to consecrate a new bishop. Instead he recalled Chad out of his retirement at Lastingham. According to Bede, Theodore was greatly impressed by Chad's humility and holiness. This was displayed particularly in his refusal to use a horse: he insisted on walking everywhere. Despite his regard for Chad, Theodore ordered him to ride on long journeys and went so far as to lift him into the saddle on one occasion.

Chad was consecrated bishop of the Mercians (literally, frontier people) and of the Lindsey people (Lindisfaras). Bede tells us that Chad was actually the third bishop sent to Wulfhere, making him the fifth bishop of the Mercians. The Kingdom of Lindsey, covering the north-eastern area of modern Lincolnshire, was under Mercian control, although it had in the past sometimes fallen under Northumbrian control. Later Anglo-Saxon episcopal lists sometimes add the Middle Angles to his responsibilities. They were a distinct part of the Mercian kingdom, centred on the middle Trent and lower Tame – the area around Tamworth, Lichfield and Repton that formed the core of the wider Mercian polity. It was their sub-king, Peada, who had secured the services of Chad's brother Cedd in 653, and they were frequently considered separately from the Mercians proper, a people who lived further to the west and north.

Monastic foundations
When Chad was made Bishop of Mercia in 669, he moved his see from Repton to Lichfield, possibly because this was already a holy site, as the scene of martyrdoms during the Roman period.  Wulfhere donated land at Lichfield for Chad to build a monastery. It was because of this that the centre of the Diocese of Mercia ultimately became settled at Lichfield. The Lichfield monastery was probably similar to that at Lastingham, and Bede makes clear that it was partly staffed by monks from Lastingham, including Chad's faithful retainer, Owin. Lichfield was very close to the old Roman road of Watling Street, the main route across Mercia, and a short distance from Mercia's main royal centre at Tamworth.
It was because of this that the ecclesiastical centre of Mercia became settled as the Diocese of Lichfield. 

Wulfhere also gave Chad land for a monastery at Barrow upon Humber in North Lincolnshire. He traveled about on foot until the Archbishop of Canterbury gave him a horse and ordered him to ride it, at least on long journeys. Chad's shrine at Lichfield was destroyed in 1538.

Wulfhere also donated land sufficient for fifty families at a place in Lindsey, referred to by Bede as Ad Barwae. This is probably Barrow upon Humber: where an Anglo-Saxon monastery of a later date has been excavated. This was easily reached by river from the Midlands and close to an easy crossing of the River Humber, allowing rapid communication along surviving Roman roads with Lastingham. Chad remained abbot of Lastingham throughout his life, as well as heading the communities at both Lichfield and Barrow.

Ministry among the Mercians
Chad then proceeded to carry out much missionary and pastoral work within the kingdom. Bede tells us that Chad governed the bishopric of the Mercians and of the people of Lindsey 'in the manner of the ancient fathers and in great perfection of life'. However, Bede gives little concrete information about the work of Chad in Mercia, implying that in style and substance it was a continuation of what he had done in Northumbria. The area he covered was very large, stretching across England from coast to coast. It was also, in many places, difficult terrain, with woodland, heath and mountain over much of the centre and large areas of marshland to the east. Bede does tell us that Chad built for himself a small house at Lichfield, a short distance from the church, sufficient to hold his core of seven or eight disciples, who gathered to pray and study with him there when he was not out on business.

Chad worked in Mercia and Lindsey for only two years before he too died during a plague. Yet St. Bede could write in a letter that Mercia came to the faith and Essex was recovered for it by the two brothers Cedd and Chad. In other words, Bede considered that Chad's two years as bishop were decisive in Christianising Mercia.

Death
Chad died on 2 March 672, and was buried at the Church of Saint Mary which later became part of the cathedral at Lichfield. Bede relates the death story as that of a man who was already regarded as a saint. In fact, Bede has stressed throughout his narrative that Chad's holiness communicated across boundaries of culture and politics, to Theodore, for example, in his own lifetime. The death story is clearly of supreme importance to Bede, confirming Chad's holiness and vindicating his life. The account occupies considerably more space in Bede's account than all the rest of Chad's ministry in Northumbria and Mercia together.

Bede tells us that Owin was working outside the oratory at Lichfield. Inside, Chad studied alone because the other monks were at worship in the church. Suddenly Owin heard the sound of joyful singing, coming from heaven, at first to the south-east, but gradually coming closer until it filled the roof of the oratory itself. Then there was silence for half an hour, followed by the same singing going back the way it had come. Owin at first did nothing, but about an hour later Chad called him in and told him to fetch the seven brothers from the church. Chad gave his final address to the brothers, urging them to keep the monastic discipline they had learnt. Only after this did he tell them that he knew his own death was near, speaking of death as "that friendly guest who is used to visiting the brethren". He asked them to pray, then blessed and dismissed them. The brothers left, sad and downcast.

Owin returned a little later and saw Chad privately. He asked about the singing. Chad told him that he must keep it to himself for the time being: angels had come to call him to his heavenly reward, and in seven days they would return to fetch him. So it was that Chad weakened and died after seven days – on 2 March, which remains his feast day. Bede writes that: "he had always looked forward to this day – or rather his mind had always been on the Day of the Lord". Many years later, his old friend Egbert told a visitor that someone in Ireland had seen the heavenly company coming for Chad's soul and returning with it to heaven. Significantly, with the heavenly host was Cedd. Bede was not sure whether or not the vision was actually Egbert's own.

Bede's account of Chad's death strongly confirms the main themes of his life. Primarily he was a monastic leader, deeply involved in the fairly small communities of loyal monks who formed his mission teams, his brothers. His consciousness was strongly eschatological: focussed on the last things and their significance. Finally, he was inextricably linked with Cedd and his other actual brothers.

Cult and relics

Chad is considered a saint in the Roman Catholic, the Anglican churches, the Celtic Orthodox Church and is also noted as a saint in a new edition of the Eastern Orthodox Synaxarion (Book of Saints). His feast day is celebrated on 2 March.

According to St. Bede, Chad was venerated as a saint immediately after his death, and his relics were translated to a new shrine. He remained the centre of an important cult, focused on healing, throughout the Middle Ages. The cult had twin foci: his tomb, in the apse, directly behind the high altar of the cathedral; and more particularly his skull, kept in a special Head Chapel, above the south aisle.

The transmission of the relics after the Reformation was tortuous. At the dissolution of the Shrine on the instructions of King Henry VIII in about 1538, Prebendary Arthur Dudley of Lichfield Cathedral removed and retained some relics, probably a travelling set. These were eventually passed to his nieces, Bridget and Katherine Dudley, of Russells Hall. In 1651, they reappeared when a farmer Henry Hodgetts of Sedgley was on his death-bed and kept praying to St Chad. When the priest hearing his last confession, Fr Peter Turner SJ, asked him why he called upon Chad. Henry replied, "because his bones are in the head of my bed". He instructed his wife to give the relics to the priest, whence they found their way to the Seminary at St Omer, in France. After the conclusion of penal times, in the early 19th century, they found their way into the hands of Sir Thomas Fitzherbert-Brockholes of Aston Hall, near Stone, Staffordshire. When his chapel was cleared after his death, his chaplain, Fr Benjamin Hulme, discovered the box containing the relics, which were examined and presented to Bishop Thomas Walsh, the Roman Catholic Vicar Apostolic of the Midland District in 1837 and were enshrined in the new St Chad's Cathedral, Birmingham, opened in 1841, in a new ark designed by Augustus Pugin.

The relics, some long bones, are now enshrined on the Altar of St Chad's Cathedral. They were examined by the Oxford Archeological Laboratory by carbon dating techniques in 1985, and all but one of the bones (which was a third femur, and therefore could not have come from Bishop Chad) were dated to the seventh century, and were authenticated as 'true relics' by the Vatican authorities. In 1919, an Annual Mass and Solemn Outdoor Procession of the Relics was held at St Chad's Cathedral in Birmingham. This observance continues to the present, on the Saturday nearest to his Feast Day, 2 March.

Chad is remembered in the Church of England and the Episcopal Church on 2 March.

Portrayals of St Chad

There are no portraits or descriptions of St Chad from his own time. The only hint that we have comes in the legend of Theodore lifting him bodily into the saddle – possibly suggesting that he was remembered as small in stature. All attempts to portray him are based entirely on imagination, and nearly all are obviously anachronistic, with a heavy stress on vestments from other periods.

Notable dedications

Churches
Chad gives his name to Birmingham's Roman Catholic cathedral, where there are some relics of the saint: about eight long bones. It is the only cathedral in England that has the relics of its patron saint enshrined upon its high altar. The Anglican Lichfield Cathedral, at the site of his burial, is dedicated to Chad, and St Mary, and still has a head chapel, where the skull of the saint was kept until it was lost during the Reformation. The site of the medieval shrine is also marked.

Chad also gives his name to a parish church in Lichfield (with Chad's Well, where traditionally Chad baptised converts: now a listed building).

Dedications are densely concentrated in the West Midlands. The city of Wolverhampton, for example, has two Anglican churches and an Academy dedicated to Chad, while the nearby village of Pattingham has both an Anglican church and primary school. Shrewsbury had a large medieval church of St Chad which fell down in 1788: it was quickly replaced by a circular church in Classical style by George Steuart, on a different site but with the same dedication. Parish Church in Montford, built in 1735-38, site of the graves of the parents of Charles Darwin. Parish Church in Coseley built in 1882. In Rugby, Warwickshire, an Orthodox Church is named for him. Further afield, there is a considerable number of dedications in areas associated with Chad's career, like the churches in Church Wilne in Derbyshire, Far Headingley in Leeds, the Parish Church of Rochdale, Greater Manchester, and the Church of St Chad, Haggerston in London, as well as some in the Commonwealth, like Chelsea in Australia. There is also a St Chad's College within the University of Durham, founded in 1904 as an Anglican hall. 

In Canada, St Chad's Chapel and College was built in 1918 in Regina, SK. Originally, it was a Catholic church and boys' school. In 1964, it became an Anglican school for girls, called St. Chad's Girls' School. Today, it is a protected historic building in Regina, and serves as a multi-use space.

The Principal Parish of the Personal Ordinariate of Our Lady of the Southern Cross is named the Church of St Ninian and St Chad.

The chapel of Brasenose College, Oxford is named the Chapel of St Hugh and St Chad.

Toponyms

There are many place names containing the element chad or something similar. In many cases, reference to the early forms of the name suggests that the derivation is not from the name Chad, but from some other word. It is possible that even where a name might reasonably be thought to derive from Chad that the individual is some other of the same name. Hence great caution needs to be exercised in explaining ancient toponyms by reference to St Chad.

That being said, a township located outside Ladysmith, Kwa-Zulu Natal is named St. Chad's after an Anglican Mission in the area. 

One toponym with a good claim to derivation from the saint's name is Chadkirk Chapel in Romiley, Greater Manchester, which dates back to the 14th century – although the site is much older, possibly dating back to the 7th century when it is believed St Chad visited to bless the well there. Kenneth Cameron points out that -kirk toponyms more frequently incorporate the name of the dedicatee, rather than the patron, so there is every reason to believe that Chadkirk really was dedicated to St Chad in the Middle Ages. It is not so certain that Chadsmoor in Staffordshire, Chadwich in Worcestershire, or Chadwick in Warwickshire, were named after the saint.

St Chad's Well near Battle Bridge on the river Fleet in London was a celebrated medicinal well and had a new pump house built in 1832. It was destroyed by the Midland Railway company, and is remembered in the street name of St Chad's Place. There is no independent evidence of Chad's visiting the site, but it clearly is named after him, and he certainly did travel in southern England. His association with wells seems ancient, and no doubt stems from the St Chad's Well at Lichfield, visited by pilgrims and probably the water supply of his monastery. This is the most likely explanation of the name.

Numerous place-names like Cheadle and Cheddleton, in the Midlands suggest a link with Chad. However "suggestions" based on late forms of the name count for little: a hypothesis should be framed instead from documentary and topographical evidence. Mostly names of this sort are derived from other Celtic roots, generally ced, cognate with modern Welsh coed, signifying a wood or heath. Cheadle, for example, is generally reckoned a tautonym, with the Old English leah, also meaning a wood, glossing the original Celtic term. This means that the origins of its name are closely related to those of Lichfield (originally derived from the Celtic for "grey wood"), to which it bears little superficial resemblance, rather than Chad or even his brother, Cedd.

There is a village in Northamptonshire called Chadstone, after which the (rather larger) suburb of Chadstone in Melbourne Australia is named.

Kidderminster, in Worcestershire, is sometimes said to be a corruption of the name of 'St Chad's Minster'.  However, place-names do not "corrupt" randomly, but evolve according to principles inherent in the history of the language. Chad or Ceadda would not normally evolve into Kidder. The existence of a minster dedicated to Chad in this town seems to be a legend traceable to Burton's 1890 History of Kidderminster, in which the author acknowledges that the only evidence for such a place is the name of the town. Later writers seem to assume the existence of the monastery and then explain the name of the town from it – a circular argument that collapses if a plausible alternative explanation is available for the name. A grant of land by Æthelbald of Mercia in 736 to one Cyneberht is generally accepted as the origin of the settlement. Cameron suggests that the minster was named after a lay benefactor (normal with -minster formations) and hypothesises Cydela, a suggestion that has found general acceptance. Another possibility might be the later Mercian dux Cydda. Certainly it seems that there was a dynasty of Mercian noblemen, all with similar names beginning Cy and connected to the area. These provide a more plausible explanation for the name of the town than St Chad or his non-existent minster.

The settlement of St Chad's (population 57) in Newfoundland was previously named "St Shad's" (after originally being "Damnable"), but was renamed after postal confusion with nearby "St Shott's" .

Schools

Denstone College in the Village of Denstone, Uttoxeter, in Staffordshire was founded by Nathaniel Woodard as the Flagship Woodard School of the Midlands. The school was founded as St Chad’s College, Denstone. The School’s Chapel is named as the Chapel of St Chad with depictions of him around the Chapel’s Narthex. The students of the school wear the famous cross of St Chad which is the school’s logo. The motto of the School is ‘Lignum Crucis Arbor Scientae’ which is Latin for ‘The Wood of the Cross is the Tree of Knowledge’. There are also depictions of him in the School’s Quadrangle.

Chad as a personal name

Chad remains a fairly popular given name, one of the few personal names current among 7th century Anglo-Saxons to do so. However, it was very little used for many centuries before a modest revival in the mid-20th century. Not all of its bearers are named directly after Chad of Mercia. Perhaps the best-known Chad of modern times who was so-named was Chad Varah, an Anglican priest and social activist, whose father was vicar of Barton-upon-Humber – the probable site of Chad's monastery in the north of Lindsey.

Patronage
Due to the somewhat confused nature of Chad's appointment and the continued references to 'chads' – small pieces of ballot papers punched out by voters using voting machines – in the 2000 US Presidential Election, it has been jocularly suggested that Chad is the patron saint of botched elections. In fact there is no official patron saint of elections, although the Church has designated a later English official, Thomas More, the patron of politicians.

The Spa Research Fellowship states that Chad is the patron saint of medicinal springs, although other listings do not mention this patronage.

St. Chad's Day (2 March) is traditionally considered the most propitious day to sow broad beans in England.

Legacy
St. Chad's College is a college of Durham University.

Notes

References

Further reading
Bassett, Steven, Ed. The Origins of the Anglo-Saxon Kingdoms. Leicester University Press, 1989. .
Fletcher, Richard. The Conversion of Europe: From Paganism to Christianity 371–1386. HarperCollins, 1997. .

Rudolf Vleeskruijer The Life of St.Chad, an Old English Homily edited with introduction, notes, illustrative texts and glossary by R. Vleeskruyer, North-Holland, Amsterdam (1953)

External links

 
 

7th-century births
672 deaths
Anglo-Saxon bishops of Lichfield
Bishops of York
Mercian saints
Northumbrian saints
Miracle workers
Yorkshire saints
7th-century English bishops
7th-century Christian saints
Burials at Lichfield Cathedral
People from Ryedale (district)
Anglican saints